Klaus Klein, Dr.rer.nat. is Professor of Biology and of Health Education and Director of the Health Education Research Unit at the University of Cologne in Cologne, Germany. He was the first faculty member at any European university to hold the title of professor of health education.

References

External links
 University of Cologne
 Gesellschaft und Gesundheit

German health educators
Academic staff of the University of Cologne
Scientists from Cologne
Johannes Gutenberg University Mainz alumni
Living people
Year of birth missing (living people)